The Lévensa is a mountain river that flows through the Alpes-Maritimes department of southeastern France. It is a left tributary of the Roya, which it joins near Tende.

References

Rivers of France
Rivers of Alpes-Maritimes
Rivers of Provence-Alpes-Côte d'Azur